Trevor Lyon (17 February 1909 – 2 June 1984) was a New Zealand cricketer. He played two first-class matches for Auckland in 1931/32.

See also
 List of Auckland representative cricketers

References

External links
 

1909 births
1984 deaths
New Zealand cricketers
Auckland cricketers
Cricketers from Wellington City